Calling All Marines is a 1939 American action film directed by John H. Auer and written by Earl Felton. The film stars Don "Red" Barry, Helen Mack, Warren Hymer, Robert Kent, Cy Kendall and Leon Ames. The film was released on September 20, 1939, by Republic Pictures.

Plot
A mobster enlists in the Marines in order to help his gang leader stealing secret military documents, but will his experience change his ways?

Cast
Don "Red" Barry as 'Blackie' Cross 
Helen Mack as Judy Fox
Warren Hymer as Snooker
Robert Kent as Sgt. Marvin Fox
Cy Kendall as Big Joe Kelly
Leon Ames as Murdock
Selmer Jackson as Col. C.B. Vincent
Janet McLeay as Pat
Walter McGrail as Capt. Chester
George Chandler as John Gordon
Jay Novello as Lefty
James Flavin as Sgt. Smith
Joe Devlin as Dutch
Thomas Carr as Young Marine

References

External links
 

1939 films
1930s English-language films
American action films
1930s action films
Republic Pictures films
Films directed by John H. Auer
American black-and-white films
Films about the United States Marine Corps
Films scored by William Lava
1930s American films